Jacob Gabe "Jack" de Vries (born 25 July 1968) is a retired Dutch politician of the Christian Democratic Appeal (CDA) party and political consultant.

Politics
De Vries studied at the VU University Amsterdam where he in 1992 obtained a MSc degree in political science. He was leader of the Christian Democratic youth movement (CDJA) and completed his military service with a stint as communications advisor to the Dutch Army. Never away from national politics, he became media spokesman of the CDA parliamentary faction in 1997, serving under Enneüs Heerma and Jaap de Hoop Scheffer. De Vries then became advisor to Jan Peter Balkenende who became political leader of the CDA in October 2001, after De Hoop Scheffer's lijsttrekker candidacy was not supported by the party. Balkenende won the 2002 elections, became Prime Minister, and brought de Vries with him to the Ministry of General Affairs.

In 2005, De Vries was appointed as CDA campaign chairman, and lead them through the 2006 municipal elections, the 2006 general election, and the 2007 provincial elections.

Resignation
He resigned on 14 May 2010 after admitting to an extra-marital affair with his personal aide a few days earlier. He announced his retirement from politics the same day.

References

External links

Official
  Drs. J.G. (Jack) de Vries Parlement & Politiek

1968 births
Living people
Christian Democratic Appeal politicians
Dutch campaign managers
Dutch nonprofit executives
Dutch nonprofit directors
Dutch lobbyists
Dutch political consultants
Dutch political commentators
Dutch speechwriters
Graduates of the Koninklijke Militaire Academie
Municipal councillors of Amsterdam
Municipal councillors in South Holland
Netherlands Reformed Churches Christians from the Netherlands
State Secretaries for Defence of the Netherlands
Royal Netherlands Army officers
Vrije Universiteit Amsterdam alumni
People from Drachten
People from Leiderdorp
20th-century Dutch military personnel
20th-century Dutch politicians
21st-century Dutch politicians